Linus Arnesson (born 11 May 1990) is a Swedish handball player for Bergischer HC and the Swedish national team.

He participated at the 2018 European Men's Handball Championship.

References

External links

1992 births
Living people
Swedish male handball players
Expatriate handball players
Swedish expatriate sportspeople in Germany
Handball-Bundesliga players
People from Hedemora
Bergischer HC players